Bondi was an electoral district of the Legislative Assembly in the Australian state of New South Wales, originally created in 1913 and named after and including the Sydney suburb of Bondi. In 1920, with the introduction of proportional representation, it was absorbed into Eastern Suburbs. Bondi was recreated in 1927 and abolished in 1971 and partly replaced by Waverley.

Members

Election results

References

Bondi
Bondi
Bondi
Bondi
Bondi
1913 establishments in Australia
1920 disestablishments in Australia
1927 establishments in Australia
1971 disestablishments in Australia